Igor Stravinsky's Concerto in D ("Basle") for string orchestra was composed in Hollywood between the beginning of 1946 and 8 August of the same year in response to a 1946 commission from Paul Sacher to celebrate the twentieth anniversary of the  (BKO—in English, Basel Chamber Orchestra), and for this reason is sometimes referred to as the "Basle" Concerto.

It was premiered on 27 January 1947 in Basel by the BKO, conducted by Paul Sacher.( Other sources say it was six days earlier, on the day of the orchestra's twentieth anniversary, 21 January, when two other works commissioned by Sacher were also premiered: Arthur Honegger's Symphony No. 4 Deliciae Basiliensis and Bohuslav Martinů's Toccata e due Canzoni.

The Concerto in D was the first composition Stravinsky created after becoming a naturalised American citizen on 28 December 1945 and the first of his works to be published under the contract with his new publisher, Boosey & Hawkes.

The concerto has been choreographed several times as a ballet, first by Dore Hoyer at the Hamburg State Opera in 1950.

Movements
The concerto has three movements:

References

Sources

External links
 
 
 , SCM Chamber Orchestra, September 2015, Verbrugghen Hall, Sydney Conservatorium of Music

Concertos by Igor Stravinsky
Stravinsky
Compositions for string orchestra
1946 compositions
Compositions in D major
Music commissioned by Paul Sacher